Attack of the Meth Gator is an upcoming 2023 horror comedy film directed by Christopher Ray and produced by The Asylum. It is a mockbuster of the film Cocaine Bear.

Cast 
The film's cast is as follows:

Production and release 
On February 24, 2023, the day of the release of Cocaine Bear, The Asylum announced the film on Twitter. The next day, in a Tweet by The Asylum featuring a video of cast members complaining about the fictional titular alligator, it was confirmed that filming had completed on February 25. The film is scheduled to release in Summer 2023.

Inspiration 
The film is loosely inspired by reports from 2019 that a Tennessee police department publicly discouraged the flushing of methamphetamine down toilets due to the possibility that alligators could ingest the drug, creating hyper-aggressive "meth gators". At the time of the reports, Kent Vliet, an alligator biologist at the University of Florida, denied the existence of so-called meth gators, stating that it was a "ridiculous notion".

See also 
List of The Asylum films
List of drug films

References

External links

2023 horror films
The Asylum films
Films about crocodilians
Films about drugs
Horror films based on actual events
Mockbuster films
Parodies of horror
Upcoming English-language films
Upcoming films
2023 films